Skelwith is a civil parish in the South Lakeland District of Cumbria, England. It contains 17 listed buildings that are recorded in the National Heritage List for England.  Of these, one is listed at Grade II*, the middle of the three grades, and the others are at Grade II, the lowest grade.  The parish is in the Lake District National Park.  The only settlement of significant size is the village of Skelwith Bridge, the rest of the parish being rural.  Most of the listed buildings are houses with associated structures, and farmhouses and farm buildings.  The other listed buildings are a church and a bridge.


Key

Buildings

References

Citations

Sources

Lists of listed buildings in Cumbria